Elgin is an unincorporated community recognized as a local urban district in the Municipality of Grassland in the Canadian province of Manitoba, Canada. It currently has a population of just over 100.

Major attractions
The Elgin and District Historical Museum, open during July and August, details the history of Elgin and of the Rural Municipality of Whitewater. The Whitewater Centennial Park, located one mile east of Elgin, is a popular recreation area for birdwatching, camping, picnicking, golfing, hiking and other recreational activities. Elgin also has a museum that is open all summer on weekends.

Notable people
 James O. Argue, Manitoba Legislative Assembly
 Bill Stilwell, Author
 Larry Maguire, Former MLA for Arthur-Virden and current Member of Parliament for Brandon-Souris

References

External links 

Local urban districts in Manitoba
Unincorporated communities in Westman Region